Rainy Sundays... Windy Dreams is Andy Irvine's first solo album, produced by Dónal Lunny and recorded at Dublin's Windmill Lane Studios in late 1979. It was released in January 1980 by Tara Records.

Andy Irvine's first solo album showcased songs and tunes from two of his main influences: side one (on the vinyl LP) featured pieces inspired by Irish traditional music, and side two concentrated on Balkan music.

Recording
The album opens with a trilogy of songs ("The Emigrants"), comprising: "The Green Fields Of Amerikay" (which Irvine learnt from Len Graham), "Farewell To Old Ireland" (Irvine's adaptation of "The Emigrant's Farewell", H743 from Sam Henry's collection) and "Edward Connors" (which Irvine learnt from Eddie Butcher of Magilligan, County Londonderry).

Then comes "The Longford Weaver" (H745 in Sam Henry's, where it is also known as "Long Cookstown" or "Nancy Whiskey"); it segues into "Christmas Eve" (reel).

The Irish set concludes with "Farewell To Balleymoney" (H615 in Sam Henry's collection).

The original album (LP) closes with the self-penned "Rainy Sundays", reminiscing about a young lady called Vida with whom Irvine pursued "a one-sided romance in Ljubljana years ago."

The CD version of Rainy Sundays... Windy Dreams, released in 1989, includes a bonus track of "Bonny Woodhall" featuring Irvine with Mick Hanly during their live performance as a duo at 'The 4th Irish Folk Festival' in Germany on April 30, 1977. "Bonny Woodhall" is Irvine's interpretation of "Bonny Woodha' " (H476 in Sam Henry's Songs of the People), which he also set to new music. On this track, Irvine accompanied himself on Fylde 'Octavius' bouzouki (with the bottom two courses strung in octave).

Track listing

1. The Emigrants – 13.51 
(a) "Come to the land of sweet liberty" (Traditional;  arranged by Irvine, Lunny, Gavin and O'Flynn)
(b) "Farewell to old Ireland" (Traditional; arranged by Irvine, Lunny, Brady and Gavin)
(c) "Edward Connors" (Traditional; arranged by Irvine and Lunny)
2. "Longford Weaver"/"Christmas Eve" (Traditional; arranged by Irvine, Gavin and Epping) / (Traditional; arranged by Irvine, Gavin, Epping and Lunny) – 5:31 
3. "Farewell to Ballymoney" (Traditional; arranged by Irvine, Lunny and Brady) – 4:31
4. "Romanian Song (Blood and Gold)" (Andy Irvine, Jane Cassidy) – 4:09 
5. "Paidushko Horo" (Traditional; arranged by Irvine and Lunny) – 3:34 
6. "King Bore and the Sandman" (Andy Irvine) – 3:05  
7. "Rainy Sundays" (Andy Irvine) – 6:13
8. "Bonny Woodhall" (Bonus Track) (Traditional; arranged by Andy Irvine) – 5:44 (*)

Personnel
Andy Irvine - vocals, bouzouki, mandolin, mandola, hurdy-gurdy, harmonica
Dónal Lunny - guitar, bouzouki, 10-string bouzouki, harmonium, Pan flute, percussion, backing vocals
Liam O'Flynn - Uilleann pipes
Paul Brady - guitar, piano
Frankie Gavin - fiddle, viola, flute
Rick Epping  - accordion, harmonica, jaw harp
John Wadham - bongo and congas
Paul Barrett - Fender Rhodes and Polymoog
Garvan Gallagher - bass guitar
Keith Donald - soprano saxophone
Lucienne Purcell - vocals
Mick Hanly - guitar (Bonus track) (*)

Recorded and mixed at Windmill Lane Studios in Dublin. 
Produced by Dónal Lunny. 
Engineered by Brian Masterson.
(*) Bonus track recorded live at 'The 4th Irish Folk Festival' in Germany on April 30, 1977.

References

External links
Rainy Sundays... Windy Dreams, by Andy Irvine.

1980 debut albums
Andy Irvine (musician) albums